This is a list of episodes from the reality television series Counting Cars, a spin-off of the series Pawn Stars, which airs on the cable network History.

Series overview

Episodes

Season 1 (2012)

Season 2 (2013)

Season 3 (2014)

Season 4 (2015)

Season 5 (2016)

Season 6 (2016)

Season 7 (2017)

Season 8 (2018)

Season 9 (2020)

References

General references

External links
 
 Count's Kustoms

Counting Cars, list of episodes
Counting Cars